("Bhatti's Poem") is a Sanskrit-language poem dating from the 7th century CE, in the formal genre of "great poem" (mahākāvya). It focuses on two deeply rooted Sanskrit traditions, the Ramayana and Panini's grammar, while incorporating numerous other traditions, in a rich mix of science and art, poetically retelling the adventures of Rama and a compendium of examples of grammar and rhetoric. As literature, it is often considered to stand comparison with the best of Sanskrit poetry.

The  also has  ("The Death of ") as an alternative title. It is improbable that this was the original title as Ravana's death is only one short episode in the whole poem.

That is not a treatise written in verse but an imaginative piece of literature which is also intended to be instructive in specific subjects. To modern tastes, however, this can create an unpardonable artificiality in the composition. To the critics of late classical times in India technical virtuosity was much admired. Much of the s popular success could also be ascribed to the fact that it must have been useful as a textbook.

The author 

The author, describes himself at the end of the book:
"I composed this poem in Valabhi which is protected by Narendra, son of Shri-dhara, hence may the fame of that king increase, since the king causes joy among his subjects."  (  22.35)
Even this eulogy is unreliable since variant readings of the verse show that his patron may have been Śrī Dharasena. Either way, the composition of the poem is placed at about 600 CE.

The form of the poem 

It springs from a historical incident or is otherwise based on some fact; it turns upon the fruition of the fourfold ends and its hero is clever and noble;
By descriptions of cities, oceans, mountains, seasons and risings of the moon or the sun; through sportings in garden or water, and festivities of drinking and love;
Through sentiments-of-love-in-separation and through marriages, by descriptions of the birth-and-rise of princes, and likewise through state-counsel, embassy, advance, battle, and the hero’s triumph;
Embellished; not too condensed, and pervaded all through with poetic sentiments and emotions; with cantos none too lengthy and having agreeable metres and well-formed joints,
And in each case furnished with an ending in a different metre—such a poem possessing good figures-of-speech wins the people’s heart and endures longer than even a kalpa.  Kāvyādarśa 1.15–19 trans. Belvalkar.
itihāsa-kath’’-ôdbhūtam, itarad vā sad-āśrayam, | , 
, | , 
, | ; 
, | , 
 | . || 
Kāvyādarśa 1.15–19
Its subject matter is the life of a hero who is at once a human soldier yet divine. Each canto has a uniform metre and there is one canto (canto 10) deploying a variety of metres. The end of each canto suggests the topic for the next. The main sentiment or rasa of the poem is “heroic”, (vīrya). The poem through its form and subject matter is conducive to the attainment of the four aims of human life: “righteousness” (dharma), “wealth and power,” (artha), “pleasure” (kāma) and “spiritual liberation”. ’s Poem contains descriptions of cities, the ocean, mountains, seasons, the rising and setting of the sun and moon, and the sports of love and sex. Five such poems are traditionally enumerated in addition to which our work is sometimes named the sixth.

Purpose and content 

“’s Poem” has two purposes: it is both a poetic retelling of the adventures of Rāma and a compendium of examples of grammar and rhetoric for the student. As literature, cantos 1, 2 and 10 in particular stand comparison with the best of Sanskrit poetry. The  provides a comprehensive exemplification of Sanskrit grammar in use and a good introduction to the science (śāstra) of poetics or rhetoric (lit. ornament). It also gives a taste of the Prakrit language (a major component in every Sanskrit drama) in easily accessible form. Finally it tells the compelling story of Prince Rāma in simple, elegant Sanskrit: this is the  faithfully retold.

The , 'Eight Books' 

The learned Indian curriculum in late classical times had at its heart a system of grammatical study and linguistic analysis. Not only is the  a description of a language unmatched in totality for any language until the nineteenth century, but it is also presented in the most compact form possible through the use of an elaborate and sophisticated metalanguage, again unknown anywhere else in linguistics before modern times. This grammar of  had been the object of intense study for the ten centuries prior to the composition of “’s Poem”. To the dry bones of this grammar  has given juicy flesh in his poem. The same could be said for poetics, prosody and Prakrit. The intention of the author was to teach these advanced sciences through a relatively easy and pleasant medium. In his own words:
This composition is like a lamp to those whose those who perceive the meaning of words and like a hand mirror for a blind man to those without grammar.
This poem, which is to be understood by means of a commentary, is a joy to those sufficiently learned: through my fondness for the scholar I have here slighted the dullard. 
  22.33–34.
The traditional story given to account for the technical or shastric nature of the poem goes that ’s class on grammar was one day disturbed by an elephant ambling between him and his pupils. This bestial interruption necessitated an interdiction of study for a year as prescribed by the solemn law books. To ensure that no vital study time was lost our poem was composed as a means of teaching grammar without resorting to an actual grammatical text.

The Structure of the Text

Grammar

“Diverse Rules” 

In the first section of the poem, the  “Diverse Rules”, where the intention appears to be the illustration of miscellaneous rules, it is not obvious how to determine which specific rule if any is intended to be exemplified in any particular verse. Hundreds of rules could in theory be applicable. The commentators assist somewhat where they cite those rules which they think to be worth quoting in that context. The other guide is the Sanskrit language itself: it is likely that the most unusual or aberrant forms would have been exemplified. The frequent coincidence of these two heuristic principles is also helpful. Where the word in the verse is also given as an example in the grammatical texts then we can be almost certain about the topic. 
It could be conjectured at this point that within this section of “Diverse Rules” those verses which were intended to illustrate the grammar would be those without figures of speech or at least with very simple figures. That supposition would be consistent with the lack of ornament in some sections of the poem and would also explain why there is such a marked distinction between ’s high style in canto 1 and much of 2 and his plainer style in much of the rest of the poem. It may be that “’s Poem” was first intended to be a typical courtly epic or “high kāvya” and that the idea of creating this new genre of educational poem or “śāstra-kāvya” evolved as the poem was being composed. This is supported by the progression in styles from highly ornate poetry in the first two cantos, through unadorned verse with no apparent systematic exemplification of grammar, the so-called “Diverse Rules Section” , to the second major section from near the end of canto 5 until the end of canto 9, the  "Illustration of Particular Topics".

"The Illustration of Particular Topics" 
The  is the "Illustration of Particular Topics" in which the verses exemplify in sequence long series of rules from the “IAST|Aṣṭādhyāyī”. Here again poetry is subjugated to the pedagogic purpose of exemplification: the metre is the humble  or śloka and there are few figures of speech to decorate the tale. This change of metre from the longer 44 syllable upajāti for the first three cantos to the shorter and simpler 32 syllable  for the next six may also be indicative of a gradually evolving intention.

How does “’s Poem” illustrate  grammar? 

These aphorisms are short coded rules, almost algebraic in form.

As an example, consider ’s rule 6.1.77: ''. How does  do it? It is thus a rule for the simple sandhi which would occur for example between the words iti and evam, smoothing the juncture between their vowels into ity evam.

It is to the layman a treasure chest whose key is locked deep inside itself. By using the references to the “IAST|Aṣṭādhyāyī” given in the table above, the reader may refer to the rules as he reads and become familiar with them in advance of reading each verse. The examples used in “’s Poem” are not included in the actual aphorisms of the “IAST|Aṣṭādhyāyī” themselves but are ones given by later commentators to facilitate discussion. The most widely used traditional examples are included in the two editions of the “IAST|Aṣṭādhyāyī” cited in the bibliography below.

"The Illustration of Finite Verbs" 

Each canto from 14 through to 22 illustrates a particular mood or tense. For details see the table above.

Relation to grammatical tradition 
A detailed study of the examples given in the  compared with those of the earlier “Great Commentary”  of Patañjali and later works such as the “Kashi Commentary” Kāśikā and “Moonlight on the Tradition” Siddhāntakaumudī still needs to be done. It would be of particular interest to see to what extent examples of usage may have been introduced into the grammatical tradition by “’s Poem”. Might the poem itself then have become an authority on usage?

Poetics

Canto 10: the figures of speech 
This section of the poem has been the most studied in modern times. It constitutes an important text in its own right in the history of Sanskrit poetics. That said, its importance lies in its raising far more questions than it answers. Tantalizingly, we have the examples only and not the explanations or contemporary commentaries. A major problem of Sanskrit poetics is the lack of agreement on any system of nomenclature for the figures. The figures are given names in some manuscripts of the  but this is no proof that these were the names that  knew. The fact that this naming of figures is quite different from that of the writers on poetics suggests that they might well pre-date them. If this is the case then in these we have the fragmentary residua of a missing link in the tradition of poetics. It is most likely that  based his treatment of the figures of speech on a text now lost. Other questions about this canto present themselves. Why is there only one example of alliteration (anuprāsa)? Was this figure not fully elaborated until ? Why do those verses said to exhibit the figure ‘illuminator’ dīpaka in the manuscripts show nothing of the sort according to later theorists? Given that many of the verses contain more than one figure, does this mean that they were not intended to be a systematic illustration of figures but rather a collection of verses showing diverse poetic traits?

Cantos 11 and 12:  and rasa 
Cantos 11 and 12 are held to display respectively the quality  of “sweetness” mādhurya and the sentiment rasa of “intensity of expression” bhāvikatva. The texts describing these qualities post-date  so again we cannot be sure that he intended to illustrate what happens to be described by later authors.
Assuming that  did intend to show these, their precise characteristics described in his source text would be best discovered from careful analysis of the language of his own work rather than from the pronouncements of later writers on poetics.

Simultaneous Prakrit and Sanskrit "": Canto 13 
Canto 13 is written in what is called “like the vernacular” , that is, it can be read in two languages simultaneously: Prakrit and Sanskrit. The Prakrit used here is of course no real vernacular but a literary version almost as highly codified as Sanskrit. Because of this Prakrit’s similarity to Sanskrit it can be read in that elevated language by someone with no knowledge of Prakrit. With minor exceptions the vocabulary and grammar used are common to both languages. Where the grammar is not common the differences are disguised by sandhi. As many of the Prakrit terminations originate in Sanskrit forms generalised to their most common forms in sandhi, this is not impossible. In Prakrit they would be bhimo, raso and samo. Because the following words all begin with voiced consonants, in Sanskrit sandhi the ending  is in all these cases changed to -o, thus making the form indistinguishable from the Prakrit. Where the Sanskrit termination is undisguisably altered in Prakrit as for example with the instrumental plural  which becomes -hi, these terminations are concealed within compounds. It is for this reason that long compounds are so extensively used in this canto. The reader will also notice a lack of finite verb forms. It is more common for participle forms to be the same in the two languages. On occasion the commentators need a deal of learning and ingenuity to explain how forms are defensible in both languages. For instance in verse  13.3 the Sanskrit sabhā “hall” would normally become sahā in Prakrit by the rule  “h is the replacement for kh, gh, th, dh and bh,” ( 2.27). Mallinātha defends the retention of sabhā in Prakrit by saying that there is the continued operation of  “generally” from an earlier rule. With the exception of verse  13.7 which is irregular and verses  13.26–28 which are in the upajāti metre, the entire canto is composed in the āryāgīti metre which is the older lyric metre most commonly used for Prakrit texts.

Morphology 

Cantos 14 through to the end at canto 22 are each written in a particular tense or mood. Given that this is a rather broad restriction it is surprising that  does not indulge in more ornamentation in these verses. He does include many obscurer roots here but in other respects his language is simple and uncluttered.

Influence beyond India 

The influence of "’s Poem" has extended to Java where it became the source text for the Old Javanese  which is the oldest surviving example of classical Javanese epic poetry (Kakawin). The Javanese  follows “’s Poem” closely as far as canto 12, sometimes to the extent of directly translating a verse, but begins to diverge thereafter. Moreover Hooykaas has also shown that the Old-Javanese  uses ‘doubling’ yamaka under ’s influence.

Notes

References 

Anderson, Rev. P. 1850. Journal of the Bombay Branch of the Royal Asiatic Society. Vol 3. No 13: Some Account of the Bhatti Kavya. M.A.
 
Gerow, Edwin. 1971. A Glossary of Indian Figures of Speech. The Hague: Mouton.
Gerow, Edwin. 1977. A History of Indian Literature: Vol. V, fasc. 3 Indian Poetics. Wiesbaden: Otto Harassowitz.
Henry, Patricia B. 2001. “The Poetics of the Old Javanese Rāmāyaņa:  A Comparison with the Sanskrit Bhaṭṭikāvya”, presented at The International Rāmayana Conference, Northern Illinois University, DeKalb, Illinois. September 21–23, 2001
Hooykaas, C. 1957. “On Some Arthālaṃkāras in the Baṭṭikāvya X”. Bulletin of the School of Oriental and African Studies: Vol. 20, No 3, Studies in Honour of Sir Ralph Turner, Director of the School of Oriental and African Studies, 1937–57, London: SOAS.
Hooykaas, C. 1958. The Old Javanese Rāmāyaṇa, an Exemplary Kakawin as to Form and Content. Amsterdam.
Kane, P. V. 1971. History of Sanskrit Poetics. Delhi: Motilal Banarsidass.
Keith, A. B. 1928. A History of Sanskrit literature. Oxford: The Clarendon press.
 
Narang, Satya Pal. 1969. Bhaṭṭikāvya, A Study. Delhi: Motilal Banarsidass.
Narang, Satya Pal. 2003. An Analysis of the Prākṛta of Bhāśā-sama of the Bhaṭṭi-kāvya (Canto XII). In: Prof. Mahapatra G.N., Vanijyotih: Felicitation Volume, Utkal University, *Bhuvaneshwar.
Söhnen, Renate. 1995. “On the Concept and Presentation of ‘yamaka’ in Early Indian Poetic Theory”. In: Bulletin of the School of Oriental and African Studies Vol. 58. No. 3 p 495–520.
Sudyaka, Lidia. 2002. What Does the Bhaṭṭi-kāvya teach? In Essays in Indian Philosophy, Religion and Literature edited by Piotr Balcerowicz and Marek Mejor, Warsaw.

Bibliography

Editions 
Fallon, Oliver. 2009. Bhatti’s Poem: The Death of Rávana (Bhaṭṭikāvya). New York: Clay Sanskrit Library.   |  
Joshi, V. N. S. and Sarma, S. V. 1914. The Bhaṭṭikāvya of Bhaṭṭi with the Commentary of Jayamangala. Bombay: Nirnaya Sagar Press.
Shastri, Shri Shesharaj Sharma. Undated. Haridas Sanskrit Series no. 136: Bhaṭṭikāvyam, Edited with the Candrakala-Vidyotini Sanskrit-Hindi Commentary. 3 vols. Varanasi: Chowkhambha Sanskrit Series Office.

Translations 

 An anonymous introduction and translation of the first canto, published in The Pandit, Varanasi (1867).
Brough, J. 1951. Selections from Classical Sanskrit Literature, with English Translation and Notes. London: Luzac and Co.
Brough, J. JB N/4 Notes on the Bhattikavya undated: 1 bundle (1) and 1 vol (2) English and Sanskrit, JB N/4/1 Draft transcription and translation of cantos 1–2, 10, 15 and 22, incomplete, JB N/4/2 Notes on cantos 1–2. University of Cambridge, Faculty of Oriental Studies, Archive Collections.
Leonardi; G[iuseppe]. G[iovanni]. 1972. Bhattikavyam. Translation and notes. Leiden: Brill
Fallon, Oliver. 2009. Bhatti’s Poem: The Death of Rávana (Bhaṭṭikāvya). New York: Clay Sanskrit Library.   |  
Karandikar, Maheshwar Anant & Shailaja Karandikar. 1982. Bhatti-kavyam, edited with an English translation. New Delhi, Motilal Banarsidass.
Turner, R. L. JB B/12 Translation of the Bhattikavya, undated, 2 vols. JB B/12/1 Translation of cantos 6–14, Annotated by Brough; JB B/12/2 Translation of cantos 15–17. University of Cambridge, Faculty of Oriental Studies, Archive Collections.

Secondary Literature 
Anderson, Rev. P. 1850. Journal of the Bombay Branch of the Royal Asiatic Society. Vol 3. No 13: Some Account of the Bhatti Kavya. M.A.
Gerow, Edwin. 1971. A Glossary of Indian Figures of Speech. The Hague: Mouton.
Gerow, Edwin. 1977. A History of Indian Literature: Vol. V, fasc. 3 Indian Poetics. Wiesbaden: Otto Harassowitz.
Henry, Patricia B. 2001. “The Poetics of the Old Javanese Rāmāyaņa:  A Comparison with the Sanskrit Bhaṭṭikāvya”, presented at The International Rāmayana Conference, Northern Illinois University, DeKalb, Illinois. September 21–23, 2001
Hooykaas, C. 1957. “On Some Arthālaṃkāras in the Baṭṭikāvya X”. Bulletin of the School of Oriental and African Studies: Vol. 20, No 3, Studies in Honour of Sir Ralph Turner, Director of the School of Oriental and African Studies, 1937–57, London: SOAS.
Hooykaas, C. 1958. The Old Javanese Rāmāyaṇa, an Exemplary Kakawin as to Form and Content. Amsterdam.
Kane, P. V. 1971. History of Sanskrit Poetics. Delhi: Motilal Banarsidass.
Keith, A. B. 1928. A History of Sanskrit literature. Oxford: The Clarendon press.
Narang, Satya Pal. 1969. Bhaṭṭikāvya, A Study. Delhi: Motilal Banarsidass.
Narang, Satya Pal. 2003. An Analysis of the Prākṛta of Bhāśā-sama of the Bhaṭṭi-kāvya (Canto XII). In: Prof. Mahapatra G.N., Vanijyotih: Felicitation Volume, Utkal University, Bhuvaneshwar.
Söhnen, Renate. 1995. “On the Concept and Presentation of ‘yamaka’ in Early Indian Poetic Theory”. In: Bulletin of the School of Oriental and African Studies Vol. 58. No. 3 p 495–520.
Sudyaka, Lidia. 2002. What Does the Bhaṭṭi-kāvya teach? In Essays in Indian Philosophy, Religion and Literature edited by Piotr Balcerowicz and Marek Mejor, Warsaw.

External links 
 GRETIL: Göttingen Register of Electronic Texts in Indian Languages Electronic text of the Bhaṭṭikāvya.
 TITUS Indica
 Official page of the Clay Sanskrit Library, publisher of classical Indian literature with facing-page texts and translations. Also offers numerous downloadable materials.
Sanskrit Documents Collection: Documents in ITX format of Upanishads, Stotras etc., and a metasite with links to translations, dictionaries, tutorials, tools and other Sanskrit resources.

Sanskrit texts
7th-century Indian books
Works based on the Ramayana
Epic poems in Sanskrit